Tpig (Aghul: Типпигъ) is a rural locality (a selo) and the administrative center of Agulsky District of the Republic of Dagestan, Russia. Population:

References

Notes

Sources

Rural localities in Agulsky District